The seventh  season of The Real Housewives of Potomac, an American reality television series, is broadcast on Bravo. It premiered on October 9, 2022, and is primarily filmed in Potomac, Maryland. Its executive producers are Steven Weinstock, Glenda Hersh, Lauren Eskelin, Lorraine Haughton-Lawson, Nora Devin, Eric Fuller, and Andy Cohen.

Cast and synopsis
The season focuses on the lives of Gizelle Bryant, Ashley Darby, Robyn Dixon, Karen Huger, Candiace Dillard Bassett, Wendy Osefo and Mia Thornton. Former housewife Charrisse Jackson-Jordan and new cast member Jacqueline Blake appear as "Friends of the Housewives".

 Blake appears during the second part of the reunion. She is seated on the end of the right couch, next to Osefo.
 Jackson-Jordan appears at the third part of the  reunion. She is seated on the right couch between Bryant and Darby.

Episodes

References

The Real Housewives of Potomac
2022 American television seasons
2023 American television seasons